Partner Track is an American legal drama streaming television series developed by Georgia Lee, based on Helen Wan's 2013 novel The Partner Track. It premiered on Netflix on August 26, 2022. In November 2022, the series was canceled after one season.

Cast and characters

Main
 Arden Cho as Ingrid Yun, a mergers and acquisitions lawyer who is trying to make partner at her law firm, Parsons Valentine & Hunt
 Alexandra Turshen as Rachel Friedman, Ingrid's best friend who also works as a litigation attorney at Parsons Valentine & Hunt
 Bradley Gibson as Tyler Robinson, Ingrid's other best friend who also works as an intellectual property lawyer at Parsons Valentine & Hunt and is trying to make partner
 Dominic Sherwood as Jeff Murphy, an attorney who recently transferred from Parsons Valentine & Hunt's London office and Ingrid's one-night stand from 6 years ago
 Rob Heaps as Nick Laren, Ingrid's love interest
 Nolan Gerard Funk as Dan Fallon, a fellow lawyer at Parsons Valentine & Hunt who is trying to make partner
 Matthew Rauch as Marty Adler, the mergers and acquisitions managing partner at Parsons Valentine & Hunt
 Roby Attal as Justin Coleman, Ingrid's paralegal at Parsons Valentine & Hunt

Recurring

 Lena Ahn as Lina Yun, Ingrid's younger sister
 Desmond Chiam as Zi-Xin 'Z' Min
 Catherine Curtin as Margo
 Fredric Lehne as Ted Lassiter
 Ronald Peet as Anthony, Tyler's boyfriend who is a political candidate in New York City
 Zane Phillips as Hunter Reed
 Will Stout as Todd Ames
 Rich Ting as Carter Min
 Daniel Gerroll as Raymond Vanderlin
 Alejandro Hernandez as Valdo
 Esther Moon as Soo-Jung Yun, Ingrid's mother
 Jo Sung as Sang-Hoon Yun, Ingrid's father

Guest starring
 Becky Ann Baker as Gigi Weaver
 Tehmina Sunny as Victoria St. Clair

Episodes

Production

Development
On September 14, 2021, Netflix gave production a series order consisting ten episodes. Partner Track is developed by Georgia Lee who is expected to executive produce alongside Sarah Goldfinger, Tony Hernandez, and Kristen Campo. The series is based on Helen Wan's 2013 novel The Partner Track who is set to be a consultant for the series. Julie Anne Robinson is set to direct the first two episodes of the series. Tanya Wexler, Kevin Berlandi, Lily Mariye, and Charles Randolph-Wright are also set to direct some episodes. Jax Media is the production company involved producing the series. It was filmed in New York. The series premiered on August 26, 2022. On November 8, 2022, Netflix canceled the series after one season.

Casting
Upon series order announcement, Arden Cho, Bradley Gibson, Alexandra Turshen, Nolan Gerard Funk, Dominic Sherwood, Rob Heaps, and Matthew Rauch were cast in starring roles. On October 29, 2021, Desmond Chiam and Tehmina Sunny joined the cast in recurring roles. On December 20, 2021, Lena Ahn was cast in a recurring capacity.

Reception

The review aggregator website Rotten Tomatoes reported a 62% approval rating with an average rating of 5.7/10, based on 13 critic reviews. Metacritic, which uses a weighted average, assigned a score of 45 out of 100 based on 4 critics, indicating "mixed or average reviews".

Between August 21 and September 11 the show was watched for 66.01 million hours globally.

References

External links
 
 

2020s American legal television series
2020s American workplace drama television series
2022 American television series debuts
2022 American television series endings
English-language Netflix original programming
Asian-American television
American legal drama television series
Television shows based on American novels
Television shows set in New York City